The 12th season of Taniec z Gwiazdami, the Polish edition of Dancing With the Stars, started on 5 September 2010 and ended on 28 November 2010. It was broadcast by TVN. Katarzyna Skrzynecka and Piotr Gąsowski continued as the hosts, and the judges were: Iwona Szymańska-Pavlović, Zbigniew Wodecki, Beata Tyszkiewicz and Piotr Galiński.

Couples

Scores

Red numbers indicate the lowest score for each week.
Green numbers indicate the highest score for each week.
 indicates the couple eliminated that week.
 indicates the returning couple that finished in the bottom two.
 indicates the winning couple of the week.
 indicates the runner-up of the week.
 indicates the third place couple of the week.

Notes:

Week 1: Andrzej Deskur scored 37 out of 40 on his first dance (Waltz). It was the second highest score ever in Week 1, the actual record belongs to Natasza Urbańska who scored 38 on her Cha Cha Cha in Week 1 of Season 10. Marcin Kwaśny got 28 points for his Waltz, making it the lowest score of the week. Maciej & Janja were eliminated despite being 4 points from the bottom.

Week 2: Patricia Kazadi scored 38 out of 40 on her first dance (Rumba). It was the second highest score ever in Week 2, the actual record belongs to Katarzyna Glinka who scored 39 on her Quickstep in Week 2 of Season 11. Anna Kalata got 20 points for her Rumba, making it the lowest score of the week. Agnieszka & Rafał were eliminated despite being 3 points from the bottom.

Week 3: Patricia Kazadi received the first perfect score of the season. Marcin Kwaśny got 19 points for his Tango, making it the lowest score of the week. Robert & Anna were eliminated despite being 4 points from the bottom.

Week 4: Patricia Kazadi received her second perfect score for the Paso Doble. Anna Kalata got 20 points for her Paso Doble, making it the lowest score of the week. Anna & Krzysztof were eliminated.

Week 5: Edyta Górniak and Maria Niklińska got their first perfect scores. Dorota Zawadzka got 24 points for her Samba, making it the lowest score of the week. Marcin & Nina were eliminated despite being 5 points from the bottom.

Week 6: Patricia Kazadi received her third perfect score for the Salsa. Dorota Zawadzka got 18 points for her Waltz in American Smooth, making it the lowest score of the week. Andrzej & Katarzyna were eliminated despite being 10 points from the bottom.

Week 7: All couples danced to songs from Polish comedy movies. Monika Pyrek and Paweł Staliński got their first perfect scores. Patricia Kazadi received her 4th perfect score for the Quickstep. There was a three-way tie on the first place, with Monika Pyrek, Paweł Staliński and Patricia Kazadi all getting perfect scores. There was also a two-way tie on the second place, with Edyta Górniak and Maria Niklińska all getting 39 out of 40. Dorota Zawadzka got 24 points for her Cha-cha-cha, making it the lowest score of the week. Dorota & Cezary were on the bottom of the leaderboard for the third consecutive week. Andrzej & Blanka were eliminated despite being 13 points from the bottom.

Week 8: All couples danced to songs from love movies. Maria Niklińska and Edyta Górniak received her second perfect scores. Patricia Kazadi received her 5th perfect score for the Cha-cha-cha, having scored three perfect scores in a row. Andrzej Gołota got 21 points for his Rumba, making it the lowest score of the week. Dorota & Cezary were eliminated despite being 8 points from the bottom.

Week 9:  All couples danced to the most famous songs of Anna Jantar. Monika Pyrek received her second perfect score for the Tango and Edyta Górniak received her third perfect score for the Samba. Andrzej Gołota got 28 points for his Tango, making it the lowest score of the week. Maria & Tomasz were eliminated despite being 8 points from the bottom.

Week 10: Patricia Kazadi received her 6th perfect score for the Rumba. Andrzej Gołota got 27 points for his Cha-cha-cha and 35 points for his Waltz, making it the lowest score of the week. Andrzej & Magdalena were on the bottom of the leaderboard for the third consecutive week. Andrzej & Magdalena were eliminated.

Week 11: Patricia Kazadi got two perfect scores for her Paso Doble and Foxtrot. Paweł Staliński received his second perfect score for the Viennese Waltz, Monika Pyrek received her third perfect score for the Viennese Waltz and Edyta Górniak received her 4th perfect score for the Rumba. Patricia & Łukasz were eliminated despite receiving perfect scores.

Week 12: Monika Pyrek, Edyta Górniak and Paweł Staliński received perfect score for the Argentine Tango. Edyta & Jan were eliminated despite being 3 points from the bottom.

Week 13:  Both Monika Pyrek and Paweł Staliński got 120 out of 120 points, making it the 4th-season finale in a row with both couples getting the highest possible score. Both couples had to perform three dances: their favorite Latin dance, their favorite Ballroom dance and a Freestyle. Monika Pyrek won the competition, having cast 55.35 percent of the votes. This is the second time the season's winner was on the 4th place on the judges' general scoreboard and the 6th time the winner was not on the first place according to the judges' scoreboard.

Guest Performances

Averages

Couples' highest and lowest scoring dances

Highest and lowest scoring performances
The best and worst performances in each dance according to the judges' marks are as follows:

The Best Score (40)

Episodes

Week 1
Individual judges scores in charts below (given in parentheses) are listed in this order from left to right: Iwona Szymańska-Pavlović, Zbigniew Wodecki, Beata Tyszkiewicz and Piotr Galiński.

Running order

Week 2
Individual judges scores in charts below (given in parentheses) are listed in this order from left to right: Iwona Szymańska-Pavlović, Zbigniew Wodecki, Beata Tyszkiewicz and Piotr Galiński.

Running order

Week 3
Individual judges scores in charts below (given in parentheses) are listed in this order from left to right: Iwona Szymańska-Pavlović, Zbigniew Wodecki, Beata Tyszkiewicz and Piotr Galiński.

Running order

Week 4
Individual judges scores in charts below (given in parentheses) are listed in this order from left to right: Iwona Szymańska-Pavlović, Zbigniew Wodecki, Beata Tyszkiewicz and Piotr Galiński.

Running order

Week 5
Individual judges scores in charts below (given in parentheses) are listed in this order from left to right: Iwona Szymańska-Pavlović, Zbigniew Wodecki, Beata Tyszkiewicz and Piotr Galiński.

Running order

Week 6
Individual judges scores in charts below (given in parentheses) are listed in this order from left to right: Iwona Szymańska-Pavlović, Zbigniew Wodecki, Beata Tyszkiewicz and Piotr Galiński.

Running order

Week 7: Polish Comedies Theme Week

Individual judges scores in charts below (given in parentheses) are listed in this order from left to right: Iwona Szymańska-Pavlović, Zbigniew Wodecki, Beata Tyszkiewicz and Piotr Galiński.

Running order

Week 8: Movies Theme Week

Individual judges scores in charts below (given in parentheses) are listed in this order from left to right: Iwona Szymańska-Pavlović, Zbigniew Wodecki, Beata Tyszkiewicz and Piotr Galiński.

Running order

Week 9: Anna Jantar Week

Individual judges scores in charts below (given in parentheses) are listed in this order from left to right: Iwona Szymańska-Pavlović, Zbigniew Wodecki, Beata Tyszkiewicz and Piotr Galiński.

Running order

Week 10
Individual judges scores in charts below (given in parentheses) are listed in this order from left to right: Iwona Szymańska-Pavlović, Zbigniew Wodecki, Beata Tyszkiewicz and Piotr Galiński.

Running order

*Due to injury, Izabela was unable to dance this week.

Week 11
Individual judges scores in charts below (given in parentheses) are listed in this order from left to right: Iwona Szymańska-Pavlović, Zbigniew Wodecki, Beata Tyszkiewicz and Piotr Galiński.

Running order

Week 12
Individual judges scores in charts below (given in parentheses) are listed in this order from left to right: Iwona Szymańska-Pavlović, Zbigniew Wodecki, Beata Tyszkiewicz and Piotr Galiński.

Running order

*Due to injury, Robert was unable to dance this week.

Week 13: Final
Individual judges scores in charts below (given in parentheses) are listed in this order from left to right: Iwona Szymańska-Pavlović, Zbigniew Wodecki, Beata Tyszkiewicz and Piotr Galiński.

Running order

Other Dance

Dance schedule
The celebrities and professional partners danced one of these routines for each corresponding week.
 Week 1: Cha-Cha-Cha or Waltz (Men) & Group Salsa (Women)
 Week 2: Rumba or Quickstep (Women) & Group Swing (Men)
 Week 3: Jive or Tango
 Week 4: Paso Doble or Foxtrot
 Week 5: Samba or Viennese Waltz
 Week 6: Salsa or an unlearned Ballroom dance in American Smooth style
 Week 7: One unlearned dance (Comedy Week)
 Week 8: One unlearned dance (Love Stories Week)
 Week 9: One unlearned dance & Group Viennese Waltz (Anna Jantar Week)
 Week 10: One unlearned & one repeated dance
 Week 11: One unlearned & one repeated dance
 Week 12: Argentine Tango & final unlearned Latin dance
 Week 13: Favorite Latin dance, favorite Ballroom dance & Freestyle

Dance chart

 Highest scoring dance
 Lowest scoring dance
 Performed, but not scored

Weekly results

 This couple came in first place with the judges.
 This couple came in first place with the judges and gained the highest number of viewers' votes.
 This couple gained the highest number of viewers' votes.
 This couple came in first place with the judges and was eliminated.
 This couple came in last place with the judges and gained the highest number of viewers' votes.
 This couple came in last place with the judges.
 This couple came in last place with the judges and was eliminated.
 This couple was eliminated.
 This couple won the competition.
 This couple came in second in the competition.
 This couple came in third in the competition.

Audience voting results
The percentage of votes cast by a couple in a particular week is given in parentheses.

Rating Figures

External links
 Official Site – Taniec z gwiazdami
 Taniec z gwiazdami on Polish Wikipedia

References

Season 12
2010 Polish television seasons